Labor-Gesher-Meretz or Emet, known as Labor-Meretz from March to April 2020, was an Israeli centre-left electoral list composed of three parties – the Israeli Labor Party, Gesher and Meretz. The list ran in the 2020 legislative election, led by Amir Peretz, chairman of the Labor Party. The list received seven seats in the election, of which three were for Labor, one was for Gesher and three were for Meretz.

History 
On 13 January 2020, Labor and Meretz leaders Amir Peretz and Nitzan Horowitz announced a technical unification of the lists ahead of the elections to the 23rd Knesset for fear that one or more of the lists would not pass the threshold. The union promoted negotiations with the Blue and White alliance, in which it was agreed that the number of ministers to be assigned to the Labor-Gesher and Meretz factions in Gantz's future government would be based on the number of faction members in the 22nd Knesset (6 and 5, respectively). The Gesher party, led by Orly Levy-Abekasis, who ran together with the Labor Party in the previous elections in the framework of Labor-Gesher, continued the expanded cooperation. The Democratic Union list, of which Meretz was a part in the previous elections, disintegrated, but Yair Golan of the Israel Democratic Party, which was part of the Democratic Union, joined Meretz in preparation for closing the lists.

For the purpose of unification, Yair Golan was initially supposed to join on the basis of the Democratic Choice shelf party, which former leader Roman Bronfman made available to him for this purpose, but finally, in light of technical difficulties, Yair Golan and Emilie Moatti (who previously ran in Labor primaries) joined Meretz.

Immediately after the inauguration of the Twenty-third Knesset, Gesher submitted a request to split into a separate parliamentary group, amid controversy over the possibility of a minority government supporting the joint list. The request was received on 23 March 2020 and the faction split into "Labor-Meretz" and Gesher. On 4 April, Peretz announced that he intended to split from the joint faction with Meretz following contacts with the Labor Party entering the government, and the split was approved two days later.

Election results

Composition

Knesset members 
The list of candidates for the 23rd Knesset elections, as submitted to the Central Election Commission on 15 January, and the following Knesset members were elected from among them:

 Labor,  Gesher,  Meretz

Notes

External links 
Official website

References 

2020 in Israeli politics
Israeli Labor Party
Political parties established in 2020
Political parties disestablished in 2020
Defunct political party alliances in Israel
Meretz